Lithogenes wahari is a species of armored catfish found in Venezuela.

References

Schaefer, S.A. and F. Provenzano, 2008. The Lithogeninae (Siluriformes, Loricariidae): anatomy, interrelationships, and description of a new species. Am. Mus. Novit. 3637:1-49.

Loricariidae
Catfish of South America
Fish of Venezuela
Taxa named by Scott Allen Schaefer
Taxa named by Francisco Provenzano-Rizzi
Fish described in 2008